Barents AirLink was a Swedish based airline. It was established as Nordkalottflyg in 1974 and operated scheduled domestic and international services. The name was changed to Barents AirLink in 2006. It was based at Luleå Airport. Barents Air Link (2006-2016) merged into Babcock Scandinavian AirAmbulance.

Services 
Barents AirLink does not operate any scheduled services and closed down the company in 2012.

It has previously operated the following scheduled services, all from Luleå:
 
 Pajala, Sweden (until October 2011).
 Tromsø, Norway (discontinued February 2008).
 Murmansk, Russia (discontinued 2007).

See also
 Airlines
 Transport in Sweden

Fleet 
The Barents AirLink fleet consisted of the following aircraft in May 2008:
 BAe Jetstream 32
 Beechcraft Super King Air 200
 Piper PA-31 Navajo/Chieftain

External links
Barents AirLink official website

Defunct airlines of Sweden
Airlines established in 1974
Airlines disestablished in 2016
Swedish companies established in 1974